Samalqan District is a district (bakhsh) in Maneh and Samalqan County, North Khorasan Province, Iran. At the 2006 census, its population was 20,621, in 5,466 families.  The District has two cities: Qazi and Shahrabad-e Khavar.  The District has two rural districts (dehestan): Almeh Rural District and Qazi Rural District.

References 

Districts of North Khorasan Province
Maneh and Samalqan County